The 2011–12 Tatran Prešov season is the 13th straight season that the club will play in the Slovak First League, the highest tier of football in Slovakia.

Squad 
As of 20 May 2012

Transfers

In

Out

Pre-season and friendlies

Competition

Slovak First Football League

Matches

Slovnaft Cup 11-12

Player seasonal records
Competitive matches only. Updated to games played 20 May 2012.

Top scorers

Source: Competitive matches

Disciplinary record
Includes all competitive matches. Players with 1 card or more included only.

Sources: soccerway.com, UEFA.com

Notes

References

1. FC Tatran Prešov seasons
Tatran Presov